The Ghana Trades Union Congress is a national centre that unites various workers' organizations in Ghana.  The organization was established in 1945.

History
The GTUC as a central co-ordinating body for 14 union groups in 1945. The unions were registered under the Trade Union Ordinance of 1941. In 1954, the union proposed that the local unions be amalgamated along industrial groupings to make the union strong. The proposal was approved in 1955. The union had 24 member unions in 1958 and was regulated by the Industrial Relations Act 56. The first elections of the GTUC was held in 1966 after Kwame Nkrumah, the first president of Ghana was overthrown. The election was conducted to replace the union leaders who were under detention under the National Liberation Council. In 1971, the GTUC was dissolved as the sole trades union congress after parliament, led by the Busia government, passed Act 383. The Act was repealed by the I.K. Acheampong government in the same year. The union's executives were replaced in a "coup d'etat" in 1983 by an Interim Management Committee at the instance of the Association of Local Unions (ALU) of the Greater Accra Region. The union in 1984 held it national congress to restore it existence and restored its constitutionality.

Membership
The membership of the organization is made up of all workers' group. A local union is formed by any five members at a work place. Various local groups which share common objectives form a national group - a local group. The local union upon formally registering with the TUC is admitted as a member of the group.

Functions
The union's functions include:
protecting the collective bargaining rights of member unions under it
advocacy and policy intervention concerning labour market and national issues that concerns its members.

Affiliates
In 2007, the member strength of the union was about 350,000 members, which had grown to 479,270 by 2018.  As of that date, the following unions were affiliated:

Former affiliates

International affiliations
The federation affiliated to the International Confederation of Free Trade Unions (ICFTU) in the early 1950s, and in 1957, it hosted the founding conference of the ICFTU African Regional Organisation.  The country's membership of the Non-Aligned Movement, and the ICFTU's opposition to the TUC spending money on a new Trades Hall building, led the TUC to resign from the ICFTU in 1959.  It retained informal links with some ICFTU affiliates, and rejoined the ICFTU in 1966. Today it is affiliated with International Trade Union Confederation, the successor of ICFTU. 

The GTUC is affiliated with various international trade union organizations, including the Organisation of Trade Unions of West Africa (OTUWA).

Leadership

Secretaries-General
1945: Manfred Gaisie
1947: Anthony Woode
1950: Charles Techie-Menson
1952: A. Allotey Moffatt
1953: E. C. Turkson-Ocran
1954: John Kofi Barku Tettegah
1959: Joe-Fio N. Meyer
1960: John Kofi Barku Tettegah
1962: Sylvanus D. Magnus-George (acting)
1964: Kwaw Ampah
1966: Benjamin Bentum
1972: Alhaji Issifu
1982: J. R. Baiden
1982: Interim committee
1983: Augustus Yankey
1993: Christian Appiah-Agyei
2000: Kwasi Adu-Amankwah
2008: Kofi Asamoah
2016: Yaw Baah

Chairs
1945: Charles Techie-Menson
1948: J. C. Vandyck
1950: J. N. Sam
1952: Larbi Odam
1953: F. E. Techie-Menson
1956: Joe-Fio N. Meyer
1958: D. K. Foevie
1964: Benjamin Bentum
1966:
E. O. Amoah
1983: E. K. Aboagye
1988: Dennis Vormawor
1992: Alex K. Bonney
2012: Georgina Opoku Amankwah
2016: Richard Kwasi Yeboah
2021: Alex Nyarko-Opoku

References

National federations of trade unions
Trade unions in Ghana
International Trade Union Confederation
Trade unions established in 1945